Lyndon Neal Smith (born 26 December 1964) is a British academic who is Professor in Computer Simulation and Machine Vision at the Department of Engineering Design and Mathematics at the University of the West of England in Bristol.

Early life 
Smith was born in Stroud, Gloucestershire on 26 December 1964 to Lionel Alfred and Dorothy Smith. He received a BSc from the University of Wales in 1986, an MSc from Cranfield University in 1988, and a PhD from the University of the West of England in 1997. He completed a secondment at the Pennsylvania State University which lasted for a year.

Career 
Smith works at the University of the West of England in Bristol.

He has developed a technique for the simulation of the packing densities of particles with irregular morphologies.

He helped develop 3D face recognition technology which he said was "on the verge of becoming really big" in 2017.

Smith has been involved in plans to replace turnstiles on the London Underground with a facial recognition system. He said that facial recognition technology under development could replace train tickets, and have applications in stores, train stations and banks.

Selected publications 
L. N. Smith, N. Huang, M. F. Hansen and M. L. Smith, "Deep 3D Face Recognition using 3D Data Augmentation and Transfer Learning", 16th International Conference on Machine Learning and Data Mining MLDM'2020, Amsterdam, The Netherlands, July 2020.
L. N. Smith, A. Byrne, M. F. Hansen, W. Zhang, M. L. Smith, 'Weed classification in grasslands using convolutional neural networks', Applications of Machine Learning, SPIE Optics Photonics, August 2019.
Lyndon Neal Smith, Wenhao Zhang, Melvyn L Smith, "2D and 3D Face Analysis for Ticketless Rail Travel", Conference: The 2IPCV'18: 2nd International Conference on Image Processing, Computer Vision, & Pattern Recognition, Las Vegas, USA, August 2018.
L. N. Smith, W. Zhang, M. Hansen, I. Hales, M. Smith, "Innovative 3D and 2D machine vision methods for analysis of plants and crops in the field", Computers in Industry, Volume 97, Pages 122–131, May 2018.
L. N. Smith, A. R. Farooq, M. L. Smith, I. E. Ivanov, A. Orlando, "Realistic and interactive high-resolution 4D environments for real-time surgeon and patient interaction" The International Journal of Medical Robotics and Computer Assisted Surgery, DOI: 10.1002/rcs.1761, 2017.
L. N. Smith, M. L. Smith, M. E. Fletcher and A. J. Henderson, "A 3D Machine Vision Method for Non-Invasive Assessment of Respiratory Function", invited paper for The International Journal of Medical Robotics and Computer Assisted Surgery, Vol. 12: p. 179–188, DOI: 10.1002/rcs.1669, 2016.
L. N. Smith, M. L. Smith, A. R. Farooq, J. Sun, Y. Ding, R. Warr, "Machine vision 3D skin texture analysis for detection of melanoma", Invited paper published in an international research journal, Sensor Review, Vol. 31 Issue: 2, pp. 111 – 119, 2011. This paper was chosen as Highly Commended Award Winner at the Literati Network Awards for Excellence 2012.
J. Sun, X. Xiaoping, A. R. Farooq, M. L. Smith, L. N. Smith, "A photometric stereo approach for chronic wound measurement", Sensor Review, Volume 35 Issue 4, 2015.
A. Sohaib, A.R. Farooq, J. Ahmed, L.N. Smith, M.L. Smith "3D reconstruction of concave surfaces using polarisation imaging", Journal of Modern Optics, Volume 62, Issue 11, 2015, pp 927–932
K. Abdul Jabbar, Mark F. Hansen, Melvyn L. Smith, Lyndon N. Smith, "Early and non-intrusive lameness detection in dairy cows using 3-dimensional video" Biosystems Engineering, Volume 153, Pages 63–69, 2017.
Lyndon Smith, "Analysis of Three Dimensional Textures Through use of Photometric Stereo, Co-occurrence Matrices and Neural Networks", Seventh International Conference of Computational Methods in Sciences and Engineering (ICCMSE 2009), Ixia, Greece September  2009. *This was published in the American Institute of Physics Conference Proceedings 1504, DOI:http://dx.doi.org/10.1063/1.4772144.*
Abdul Jabbar, K., Hansen, M. F., Smith, M. and Smith, L., "Quadruped locomotion analysis using three-dimensional video", In: IEEE ICSAE Conference, Newcastle, UK, 20–21 October 2016.
Abdul Jabbar, K., Hansen, M. F., Smith, M. and Smith, L. "Overhead spine arch analysis of dairy cows from three-dimensional video", In: Eighth International Conference on Graphic and Image Processing (ICGIP 2016), Tokyo, Japan, 29–31 October 2016.
M. F. Hansen, M. L. Smith, L. N. Smith, I. Hales and D. Forbes, "Non-intrusive automated measurement of dairy cow body condition using 3D video", In: British Machine Vision Conference - Workshop of Machine Vision and Animal Behaviour, Swansea, Wales, UK, 10 September 2015.

Books:
L. N. Smith, "A knowledge-based System for Powder Metallurgy Technology", Book published by Professional Engineering Publishing, 2003.
Lyndon N. Smith, "Why You Can’t Catch a Rocket to Mars: Some Personal Reflections on Science and Society", 2020. https://www.amazon.co.uk/gp/product/B08NZHCPXZ?ref_=dbs_m_mng_rwt_calw_tpbk_0&storeType=ebooks
Lyndon N. Smith, "STAR TREK NATION: An Englishman’s view of America", 2021. https://www.amazon.co.uk/gp/product/B09JJCH2XL?ref_=dbs_m_mng_rwt_calw_tpbk_1&storeType=ebooks

References

External links 
 

1964 births
Living people
Academics of the University of the West of England, Bristol
People from Stroud
Alumni of the University of Wales
Alumni of Cranfield University
Alumni of the University of the West of England, Bristol